Stephen Brian Wilkes (born 30 June 1967) is an English former professional footballer who played in the Football League as a midfielder. Wilkes was born in Preston, Lancashire. He was a part of the Wigan Athletic youth club. He has managed over 1000 games and is currently Northwich Victoria Manager.

References

1967 births
Living people
English footballers
Association football midfielders
Preston North End F.C. players
Southport F.C. players
Morecambe F.C. players
Bamber Bridge F.C. players
FC Eindhoven players
English Football League players
Northwich Victoria F.C. managers
English football managers